Dickson Nnamdi Iroegbu  is a Nigerian film director and producer. He has directed and produced several Nollywood hit movies. In 2005, at the maiden edition of the African Movie Academy Awards, Iroegbu won three awards for the movie The Mayors, including the awards for Best Picture, Best Screenplay and Best Director.

Awards and nominations
African Movie Academy Awards:
2005: Best Director (won)
2005: Best Picture (won)
2005: Best Screenplay (won)

Filmography

See also
 Ikenna Iroegbu (born 1995), American-born Nigerian basketball player for Hapoel Galil Elyon of the Israeli Basketball Premier League

References

External links

Living people
Year of birth missing (living people)
People from Mbaise
Nigerian film directors
Ahmadu Bello University alumni
Best Director Africa Movie Academy Award winners
Nigerian film producers
Igbo people